Vellangallur is a grama panchayath situated in Thrissur district in the Indian state of Kerala.

Geography 
The nearest towns are Irinjalakuda, Kodungallur and Mala. 

Vellangallur panchayat office is situated in Konathukunnu. Vallivattam, Thekkumkara, Vadakkumkara, and Karumatra
villages are included in this panchayat. 

Vallivattom is a village in the Mukundapuram taluka with an area of 845 hectares and harbouring 2112 households with total population of 8537 as per the 2011 Census.

Transport 
The village sits at the junction of  Trissur Kodungallur State Highway 22 and Chalakudy Mathilakam Road connecting NH17 and NH47. The nearest railway station is Irinjalakuda (11 km). The nearest airport is Kochi International Airport (37km).

Demographics 
The population is 32,846, including 15,599 men and 17,247 women. 

The literacy rate is 88.19%. Male literacy is 93.22%  and female literacy is 83.76%.

Economy 
Bank branches in this panchayat include Canara Bank, Indian Overseas Bank, South Indian Bank, Panjab National Bank, Federal Bank and Dhanalakshmi Bank. Several other Cooperative banks are present.

Salim Ali Foundation runs a sustainable development project. The Project envisages development without damaging the environment.

References

External links
 Internet News Portal

Villages in Thrissur district